Anton Dahlström (born 27 August 1990) is a Swedish footballer who last played for FK Karlskrona as a defender.

References

External links

 (archive) 

1990 births
Living people
Association football defenders
Mjällby AIF players
Allsvenskan players
Swedish footballers